The Phaegopterina are a subtribe of tiger moths in the tribe Arctiini, which is part of the family Erebidae. The subtribe was described by William Forsell Kirby in 1892. 469 species of Phaegopterina are present and 52 that are recently discovered in Brazil.

Taxonomic history
The subtribe was previously classified as the tribe Phaegopterini of the family Arctiidae.

In 2002, Jacobson & Weller proposed a clade Euchaetes within Arctiini. In 2010, V. V. Dubatolov proposed that this clade should be classified as subtribe Euchaetina, containing eight arctiini genera, including Euchaetes. However, the name Euchaetina does not appear in the comprehensive 2010 checklist assembled by J. Donald Lafontaine and B. Christian Schmidt, nor its later updated versions, which place those genera under Phaegopterina.

Genera
The following genera are included in the subtribe. Numerous arctiine genera have not yet been assigned to a subtribe, so this genus list may be incomplete.

Aemilia
Agaraea
Amastus
Amaxia
Ammalo
Anaxita
Amphelarctia
Aphyarctia
Aphyle
Apiconoma
Apocrisias
Apyre
Araeomolis
Arctagyrta
Arctiarpia
Astralarctia
Azatrephes
Baritius
Bernathonomus
Bertholdia
Biturix
Calidota
Carales
Carathis
Castrica
Cissura
Coiffaitarctia
Cratoplastis
Cresera
Cycnia
Demolis
Dialeucias
Diaphanophora
Disconeura
Echeta
Ectypia
Elysius
Emurena
Epicrisias
Epimolis
Eriostepta
Ernassa
Euchaetes
Eucyrta
Euerythra (formerly in Arctiina)
Eupseudosoma
Evius
Fasslia
Glaucostola
Gonotrephes
Gorgonidia
Graphea
Haemanota
Haemaphlebiella
Halysidota
Haplonerita
Hemihyalea (may belong in Amastus)
Himerarctia
Hyalarctia
Hyperandra
Hyperthaema
Hypidalia
Hypidota
Hypocrisias
Hyponerita
Idalus
Ischnocampa
Ischnognatha
Kodiosoma (formerly in Arctiina)
Laguerreia (tentatively placed here)
Lalanneia (tentatively placed here)
Lampruna
Lepidojulia
Lepidokirbyia
Lepidolutzia
Lepidozikania
Lepypiranga
Lerina (tentatively placed here)
Leucanopsis
Lophocampa
Machadoia
Machaeraptenus
Mazaeras
Melanarctia
Melese
Mellamastus
Metacrisia
Metaxanthia
Munona
Nannodota
Neidalia
Neonerita
Neoplynes
Neozatrephes
Nezula
Nyearctia
Ochrodota
Onythes
Opharus
Ordishia
Ormetica
Pachydota
Pagara
Paranerita
Parathyris
Pareuchaetes
Parevia
Pelochyta
Phaegoptera
Phaeomolis
Pitane
Pithea
Premolis
Pryteria
Pseudamastus
Pseudapistosia
Pseudepimolis
Pseudischnocampa
Pseudohemihyalea (formerly in Hemihyalea)
Pseudopharus
Pseudotessellarctia
Psychophasma
Purius
Pydnaodes
Pygarctia
Pygoctenucha
Regobarrosia
Rhipha
Robinsonia
Romualdia
Scaptius
Schalotomis
Selenarctia
Senecauxia (tentatively placed here)
Soritena
Stidzaeras
Sutonocrea
Sychesia
Symphlebia
Syntomostola
Tessella
Tessellarctia
Tessellota
Thyromolis
Thysanoprymna
Trichromia
Tricypha
Trocodima
Turuptiana
Viviennea
Wanderbiltia
Watsonidia
Xanthoarctia
Xanthophaeina
Zaevius
Zatrephes

References

Lafontaine, J. D. & Fibiger, M. (2006). "Revised higher classification of the Noctuoidea (Lepidoptera)". Canadian Entomologist. 138: 610–635. 
Lafontaine, J. D. & Schmidt, B. C. (2010). "Annotated check list of the Noctuoidea (Insecta, Lepidoptera) of North America north of Mexico". ZooKeys. 40: 1–239. 
Schmidt, B. C. & Opler, P. A. (2008). "Revised checklist of the tiger moths of the Continental United States and Canada". Zootaxa. 1677: 1-23.
Witt, T. J. & Ronkay, L. (2011). "Lymantriinae and Arctiinae - Including Phylogeny and Check List of the Quadrifid Noctuoidea of Europe". Noctuidae Europaeae. 13: 1-44
Teston, J. A., & Ferro, V. G. (2016). Arctiini Leach,[1815] (Lepidoptera, Erebidae, Arctiinae) of the Brazilian Amazon. I—Subtribe Phaegopterina Kirby, 1892. Check list, 12(2), 1852.

 
Lepidoptera subtribes